Harpal Singh Sokhi is a  renowned celebrity chef from India.  Today his style is mimicked by the country for his famous quote ‘Namak Shamak, Namak Shamak, Daal Dete Hain’ as a host of the most popular culinary show Turban Tadka on FoodFood channel on Indian television, he’s already bagged the title of “Energy Chef of India” and made people all charged-up and passionate about cooking! . He is the real multi-talented Chef who has opened up doors and streams for all aspiring chefs not only in the field of Hospitality but also in the field of Acting, Movies, Dancing and much more. A Chef with most Memes in India using his tag line #namakshamak. The real Salt Man of India, the tags that he is popular for #happydancingchef #dancingchefof India #energychefofindia and much more. His recent debut as an actor in the top 10 fiction shows of Indian #channamereya has garnered quite an eye balls across genre.

In 2022 his restaurant Karigari by Chef Harpal Singh Sokhi was awarded the Best Chef driven restaurant by Indian Restaurant Congress. 

Karigari by Chef Harpal Singh Sokhi was also awarded the Most Admired Food Service Launch of the Years New Outlet by Images Food Service Awards . 

Chef Harpal Singh Sokhi was awarded Silver Winner by the Indian Hospitality Excellence awards 2022 and also Awarded Celebrity Chef of the Year 2022 by FoodFoodTV.

He has not only redefined cookery shows with his own unique style with humour and real Punjabi style which is why he bagged the most recognized and admired face on Television as a Chef of the year 2012 honoured by Golden Star Awards also has achieved Iconic Achievers Award 2018. Recent Achievements like Food Fusion Leadership Awards 2018 & Annapoorna Food Retail Award 2018. He is also awarded as the best Chef of the year 2016 by Indian Restaurant Congress was adding another feather to his cap of all achievements. Foodfood the pioneer in Food Television network in India awarded Chef Harpal Singh Sokhi as the most recognized face of the  year in 2017. He has hosted the cooking show Turban Tadka, and is the Director of Turban Tadka Hospitality.

Early life 

Harpal Singh Sokhi grew up in Kharagpur, West Bengal, where his father worked with the Indian Railways. He has two older sisters and one brother. He studied at the South Eastern Railway Mixed Higher Secondary School. He was inspired to become a chef by his mother's cooking. His father travelled a lot for work, and encouraged his kids to try a lot of different cuisines. His brother also cooked food at a langar.

Inspired by the academic atmosphere in Kharagpur (which is home IIT Kharagpur), Sokhi initially wanted to pursue engineering, but was not good at studies. He also expressed interest in joining the Indian Air Force, but by the time he decided to apply, he had crossed the maximum age limit. He came to know about the hotel management career from a friend who studied in Siliguri. Sokhi's brother encouraged him to appear for the hotel management entrance exam, and Sokhi enrolled at the Institute of Hotel Management (IHM), Bhubaneswar in 1984.

Career as a chef 

In 1987, Sokhi completed his diploma in catering from IHM Bhubaneswar. He started his career as a trainee cook at The Oberoi in Bhubaneswar. At 27, he became an executive chef.

Sokhi spent several years in learning different international cuisines. He learnt Hyderabadi cooking from Ustad Habib Pasha and Begum Mumtaz Khan. He also did research on Ayurveda-based food to see how cooking can improve nutritive value of the food.

He went on to work as a chef with several restaurants, including:

 Vintage, a Hyderabadi speciality restaurant
 Centaur Hotel, Juhu, Mumbai
 Hotel Tuli International, Nagpur (1994–98)
 The Regent, Mumbai (1998–2001)
 The Regent, Jakarta
 Taj Lands End, Bandra, Mumbai
 Blue Cilantro in Andheri, Mumbai

Sokhi has conducted cooking schools at Regent Jakarta and The Peninsula Manila. He has also organised Indian food festivals internationally.

In 2001, Sokhi and others founded Khana Khazana India Pvt Ltd. He led food trials, developed ready-to-eat products for the Khazana brand, and conceptualised a range of chocolate mithais (Indian sweets). He has also been involved with the Ching's Secret brand.

Sokhi executed the business class menus on Singapore Airlines for seven years, and also conducted the "Ancient Indian Food" promotion on Indian Airlines. He has also developed menus for SOTC travels. Besides, he has developed menus for Wockhardt Hospitals.

Sokhi has taught as a guest faculty member at the N. L. Dalmia Institute of Management Studies and Research. He has also designed menus for many events, including weddings and birthday parties.

Television 

In 1993, Sokhi hosted the first episode of Khana Khazana on Zee TV. He launched his first solo show Harpal ki Rasoi on Nagpur's local Siti Cable TV, but the show was not as successful as Sokhi expected it to be. Later, Sokhi started hosting Turban Tadka on Food Food channel, which gained him popular recognition in India. He is famous for his phrase "Namak Shamak" and song he sings while seasoning his food. It became one of the top cookery shows by TRPs. Sokhi came to be known for his phrase namak shamak.

He has also hosted the TV shows Kitchen Khiladi and Sirf Tees Minute on FoodFood channel. In 2014, he hosted Zee News' road food show Desh da Swaad, travelling across India. He is also one of India's top chefs on YouTube. In 2016, he participated in the dance reality show Jhalak Dikhhla Jaa 9. Incidentally he is also the first Chef to have work tried his hands in a bollywood movie called BANKCHOR which was released mid of 2017.

Other ventures 

In 1998, Sokhi conceptualised and executed the opening of the Indian specialty restaurant Khazana in Dubai. He also formulated business plans and opening plans for other restaurants. 

Sokhi has written food columns for newspapers and magazines. He is one of the oldest associates of Sanjeev Kapoor, and has developed content for his books. The two have authored a book Royal Hyderabadi Cooking.

Personal life 

Sokhi lives in Mumbai with his wife Aparna. The couple has two daughters: Anushka and Antra. He is fluent in six languages: English, Hindi, Punjabi, Bengali, Odia and Telugu.

References

External links 
 
 
 

Living people
Indian food writers
Indian chefs
Indian television chefs
Chefs of Indian cuisine
Indian YouTubers
People from Paschim Medinipur district
Punjabi people
Indian Sikhs
People from Kharagpur
1966 births